The Daks Tournament was an important professional golf tournament held in England from 1950 to 1971 and was generally held in early June. 17 of the 22 events were held at the Wentworth Club. Neil Coles enjoyed considerable success in the event winning the tournament four times and being a runner-up on four occasions. The tournament was sponsored by DAKS.

Winners

References

External links
Results on where2golf.com

Golf tournaments in England
Recurring events established in 1950
Recurring events disestablished in 1971